Sengottai Singam is a 1958 Indian Tamil-language film directed by V. N. Reddy and produced by Sandow M. M. A. Chinnappa Thevar. The film stars Udaykumar and B. Saroja Devi, with Pandari Bai, S. V. Sahasranamam and E. R. Sahadevan in supporting roles. It was released on 11 July 1958.

Plot 

The wealthy owner of the Sengottai estate orders for Lakshmi, a factory worker and her infant son to be killed because they came in the way of his car. Unknown to him, Lakshmi is his son Dharmalingam's lover and the mother of his son. His henchman secretly allows Lakshmi and her son to escape. Circumstances lead to the separation of the two, and the boy is raised by Malayandi, a tribal leader. Dharmalingam is grief-stricken that he has lost his lover and child, and refuses to marry the woman of his father’s choice. Meanwhile, Lakshmi's son is named Singam and grows up a fierce warrior who fights with animals and enemies. Singam later falls in love with a young woman. The rest of the film deals with how the family reunites.

Cast 
 Udaykumar as Singam
 B. Saroja Devi as Singam's lover
 Pandari Bai as Lakshmi
 S. V. Sahasranamam as Dharmalingam
E. R. Sahadevan as Malayandi
 C. L. Anandan
 Mynavathi
Pushpalatha

Production 
Sengottai Singam was the third production of Sandow M. M. A. Chinnappa Thevar's company Devar Films. It featured Kannada actors Udaykumar and B. Saroja Devi as the male and female leads respectively. The story was written by Rajagopal, and the screenplay by Puratchidasan. V. N. Reddy, a filmmaker based in Bombay, directed the film and also worked as cinematographer, while being assisted by N. S. Varma, an already established South Indian cinematographer. M. G. Balu Rao and M. A. Mariappan jointly edited the film.  Shooting took place at Vijaya Vauhini Studios.

Soundtrack 
The soundtrack of the film was composed by K. V. Mahadevan, while the lyrics were written by A. Maruthakasi, Velsamy Kavi and Puratchidasan. The song "Nadada Raja", written by Maruthakasi and picturised on Udaykumar's character riding an elephant, gained popularity.

Release and reception 
Sengottai Singam was released on 11 July 1958. Kanthan of Kalki said the film would disappoint those who had already seen Tarzan films. According to historian Randor Guy, the film was not a major commercial success, but it gained much attention due to its music and onscreen animals, especially two horses named Iqbal and Dilip.

References

External links 
 

Films about animals
Films scored by K. V. Mahadevan
Films set in jungles
Indian adventure films
1950s Tamil-language films
1950s adventure films